Hickory Farms, LLC is an American food gift retailer with headquarters in Chicago. Richard Ransom established the company in 1951 when he began selling handcrafted cheese at local fairs. By 1959, the company added summer sausage and opened its first retail store in Maumee, Ohio. By 1981, it operated over 1,000 Hickory Farms stores and seasonal kiosks open in the United States and Canada.

In 2000, the company shifted away from year-round mall-based locations to focus on internet and catalog sales. As a result, the company closed its remaining year-round mall stores. The company will ,however, still operate pop-up stores and kiosks in malls during the holiday season.

In 2017, the company relocated to Chicago, Illinois, from Toledo, Ohio. Its owner, Modjule, LLC, is also headquartered in Chicago.

In 2021, Wicked Good Cupcakes joined the Hickory Farms family of gourmet food gifts. Wicked Good Cupcakes gained popularity in 2013.

Today, Hickory Farms specializes in gift boxes and baskets, wine gifts, chocolates, and charcuterie gifts. Its foods are found in more than 500 pop-up shops and kiosks in retail shopping centers during the holiday season. The company also does multichannel marketing, offering products year-round in different outlets.

See also

List of food companies

References

External links

 Hickory Farms

Food retailers of the United States
Food and drink companies based in Chicago
Retail companies established in 1951
1951 establishments in Ohio
American companies established in 1951